Liza Bagrationi (born 21 July 1974) is a Georgian singer. She descends from the Georgian noble (tavadi) family of Bagration-Davitishvili.

References 

1974 births
Living people
21st-century women opera singers from Georgia (country)
Nobility of Georgia (country)
Branches of the Bagrationi dynasty